The 2017 Appalachian State Mountaineers football team represented Appalachian State University in the 2017 NCAA Division I FBS football season. The Mountaineers played their home games at Kidd Brewer Stadium in Boone, North Carolina, and competed in the Sun Belt Conference. They were led by fifth-year head coach Scott Satterfield. They finished the season 9–4, 7–1 in Sun Belt play to earn a share of the Sun Belt championship for the second consecutive year. They received an invite to the Dollar General Bowl where they defeated Toledo for the second consecutive year in a bowl game.

Previous season 
The Mountaineers finished the 2016 season 10–3, 7–1 to earn a share of the Sun Belt championship, the school's first conference championship since joining the FBS in 2014. They were invited to the Camellia Bowl where they defeated Toledo.

Schedule
Appalachian State announced its 2017 football schedule on March 1, 2017. The 2017 schedule consisted of six home and away games in the regular season. The Mountaineers hosted Sun Belt foes Coastal Carolina, Georgia Southern, North Mexico State, and Louisiana–Lafayette, and traveled to Georgia State, Idaho, Louisiana–Monroe, and Texas State

The Mountaineers hosted two of the four non-conference opponents, Savannah State from the Mid-Eastern Athletic Conference and Wake Forest from the Atlantic Coast Conference, and traveled to Georgia from the Southeastern Conference and UMass, who is independent from a conference. 
 

Schedule Source:

Players in the 2018 NFL Draft

References

Appalachian State
Appalachian State Mountaineers football seasons
Sun Belt Conference football champion seasons
LendingTree Bowl champion seasons
Appalachian State Mountaineers football